William T. Baker (born December 23, 1956) is an American residential designer, and author.

Early life and education
Baker was born in Nashville, Tennessee.  He graduated from Auburn University in 1979 with a BS in finance, then Emory University with an MBA.

Career
Baker founded an Atlanta-based firm, William T. Baker & Associates, in 1985.

He received the prestigious Arthur Ross Award for Architecture in New York City in 1993.

William T. Baker holds professional memberships in The Institute of Classical Architecture & Classical America (ICA), the American Institute of Building Designers (AIBD), and the International Network for Traditional Building, Architecture & Urbanism (INTBAU).

Baker is also the author of New Classicists, a book for architectural students and home design aficionados in the United States and Asia. In 2008, he published a second book, Architectural Excellence in a Diverse World Culture, discussing the principles of architectural aesthetics.  In 2011 he published the first of a new three part series titled "Great American Homes" featuring his most recent work.

Books
2004: New Classicists
2008: Architectural Excellence in a Diverse World Culture
2011-17: Great American Homes Vols. 1-3

See also
List of Auburn University people
Classical architecture
Classical order
New Classical architecture

References

External links
 The Official William T. Baker website
 Interaction-Design.org

1956 births
Living people
Auburn University alumni
Emory University alumni
People from Nashville, Tennessee
American designers
People from Atlanta
New Classical architects
21st-century American architects